This is a list of current routes operated by the mass transit agency Spokane Transit Authority in Spokane, Washington. Routes are organized by route number. Discontinued routes and former versions of existing routes are not listed. Routes are color-coded in accordance with the STA's Map, with green for shuttles, red for high-frequency, blue for basic-frequency and pink for express routes.

These lists reflect the August 28, 2022 STA service changes.

Routes 11 and 12 (Downtown Shuttles)

Routes 4 & 20 to 29 (North Spokane)

Routes 30 to 39 (Crosstown Routes)

Routes 4 & 40 to 49 (South Spokane)

Routes 6 & 60 to 69 (West Plains)

Routes 74 & 90 to 99 (Spokane Valley)

Routes in 100s (Commuter Express Routes)

Routes in 600s (EWU Express Routes)

Routes in 700s (Valley Express Routes)

References

External links
 Spokane Transit Authority Routes

Transportation in Spokane, Washington
Spokane
Bus transportation in Washington (state)
Bus routes, Spokane